Joy McNichol (born 17 February 1974 in Wingham, Ontario) is a Canadian former basketball player who competed in the 2000 Summer Olympics.

References

1974 births
Living people
Canadian women's basketball players
Olympic basketball players of Canada
Basketball players at the 2000 Summer Olympics
People from Wingham, Ontario